Maria Grigorievna Skuratova-Belskaya (c. 1552 ~ died 10/20 June 1605) was a Tsaritsa of Russia as the spouse of Tsar Boris Godunov. She served as regent of Russia during the minority of her son, Tsar Feodor II of Russia, in 1605.

Life
Maria Skuratova-Belskaya was the daughter of Tsar Ivan the Terrible's favorite, Malyuta Skuratov-Belskiy. In 1570, she married Boris Godunov. The marriage was reportedly arranged because Godunov wished to strengthen his position at court by becoming the son-in-law of the Tsar's favorite.

In 1598, her spouse became Tsar of Russia, making her Tsaritsa. During her tenure as tsarina, Maria Feodorovna Pozharskaya was her favorite and reportedly exerted influence over her. Upon the death of her spouse in April 1605, her son was proclaimed Tsar. As he was a minor, a regency was needed to govern Russia during his minority, and Maria Skuratova-Belskaya was proclaimed regent. Her regency, and that of her son, was however only to last for a couple of months.

On 10/20 June 1605, she was strangled with her son Feodor in his apartment.

 Issue 
 Tsarevna Xenia Borisovna
 Tsar Feodor II of Russia

References

 Мария Григорьевна // Славянская энциклопедия: XVII век в 2-х томах. A-M. Том 1

|-

|-

16th-century births
1605 deaths
16th-century Russian people
17th-century Russian people
16th-century Russian women
17th-century Russian women
Russian tsarinas
House of Godunov
Murdered Russian royalty
Deaths by strangulation
17th-century women rulers
Murder in 1605